Frances Xavier Cabrini  (July 15, 1850 – December 22, 1917), also called Mother Cabrini, was an Italian-American Catholic religious sister. She founded the Missionary Sisters of the Sacred Heart of Jesus, a religious institute that was a major support to her fellow Italian immigrants to the United States. She was the first U.S. citizen to be canonized a saint by the Catholic Church, on July 7, 1946.

Early life
She was born Maria Francesca Cabrini on July 15, 1850, in Sant'Angelo Lodigiano, in the Lombard Province of Lodi, then part of the Austrian Empire. She was the youngest of the thirteen children of farmers Agostino Cabrini and Stella Oldini. Only four of the thirteen survived beyond adolescence.

Born two months early, she was small and weak as a child and remained in delicate health throughout her life. During her childhood, she visited an uncle, Don Luigi Oldini of Livagra, a priest who lived beside a swift canal. While there, she made little boats of paper, dropped violets in them, called the flowers "missionaries", and launched them to sail off to India and China. At thirteen, Francesca attended a school run by the Daughters of the Sacred Heart of Jesus. Five years later she graduated cum laude, with a teaching certificate.

After her parents died in 1870, she applied for admission to the Daughters of the Sacred Heart at Arluno. These sisters were her former teachers, but reluctantly, they told her she was too frail for their life. She became the headmistress of the House of Providence orphanage in Codogno, where she taught and drew a small community of women to live a religious way of life. Cabrini took religious vows in 1877 and added Xavier (Saverio) to her name to honor the Jesuit saint, Francis Xavier, the patron saint of missionary service. She had planned, like Francis Xavier, to be a missionary in the Far East.

Missionary Sisters of the Sacred Heart of Jesus
In November 1880, Cabrini and seven other women who had taken religious vows with her founded the Missionary Sisters of the Sacred Heart of Jesus (MSC). She wrote the Rule and Constitutions of the religious institute, and she continued as its superior general until her death. The sisters took in orphans and foundlings, opened a day school to help pay expenses, started classes in needlework and sold their fine embroidery to earn a little more money. The institute established seven homes and a free school and nursery in its first five years. Its good works brought Cabrini to the attention of Giovanni Scalabrini, Bishop of Piacenza, and of Pope Leo XIII.

Mission to United States

In September 1887, Cabrini went to seek the pope's approval to establish missions in China. Instead, he urged that she go to the United States to help the Italian immigrants who were flooding to that nation, mostly in great poverty. "Not to the East, but to the West" was his advice.

Cabrini left for the United States, arriving in New York City on March 31, 1889, along with six other sisters. In New York she encountered disappointment and difficulties. Archbishop Michael Corrigan, who was not immediately supportive, found them housing at the convent of the Sisters of Charity. She obtained the archbishop's permission to found the Sacred Heart Orphan Asylum in rural West Park, New York, later renamed Saint Cabrini Home.

Cabrini organized catechism and education classes for the Italian immigrants and provided for many orphans' needs. She established schools and orphanages despite tremendous odds. She was as resourceful as she was prayerful, finding people who would donate what she needed in money, time, labor, and support. In New York City, she founded Columbus Hospital, which merged with Italian Hospital to become Cabrini Medical Center from 1973 until its closure in 2008.

In Chicago, Illinois, the sisters opened Columbus Hospital in Lincoln Park and Columbus Extension Hospital (later renamed Saint Cabrini Hospital) in the heart of the city's Italian neighborhood on the Near West Side. Both hospitals eventually closed in 2001–2002. Their foundress's name lives on in Chicago's Cabrini Street.

She founded 67 missionary institutions to serve the sick and poor, long before government agencies provided extensive social services – in New York; Chicago and Des Plaines, Illinois; Seattle; New Orleans; Denver and Golden, Colorado; Los Angeles; Philadelphia; and in countries throughout Latin America and Europe. In 1926, nine years after her death, the Missionary Sisters achieved Cabrini's original goal of becoming missionaries to China.

Cabrini was naturalized as a United States citizen in 1909.

Death
Cabrini died of complications from malaria at age 67 in Columbus Hospital in Chicago on December 22, 1917, while preparing Christmas candy for local children.

Her body was initially interred at what became Saint Cabrini Home, the orphanage she founded in West Park, Ulster County, New York.

Veneration
In 1933, her body was exhumed and divided as part of the process toward sainthood. At that time, her head was removed and is preserved in the chapel of the congregation's international motherhouse in Rome. Her heart is preserved in Codogno, where she founded her missionary order. An arm bone is at her national shrine in Chicago. Most of the rest of her body is at her major shrine in New York.

Cabrini was beatified on November 13, 1938, by Pope Pius XI, and canonized on July 7, 1946, by Pope Pius XII. Her beatification miracle involved purportedly restoring the sight of a day-old baby who had been blinded by a 50% silver nitrate solution instead of the normal 1% solution in the child's eyes. The child, named Peter Smith (1921–2002), would later be present at her beatification and become a priest. Her canonization miracle involved the purported healing of a terminally ill member of her congregation. When Cabrini was canonized, an estimated 120,000 people filled Chicago's Soldier Field for a Mass of thanksgiving.

In the Roman Martyrology, her feast day is December 22, the anniversary of her death, the day ordinarily chosen as a saint's feast day. Following the reforms in Pope John XXIII's Code of Rubrics, the United States since 1961 has celebrated Cabrini's feast on November 13, the anniversary of her beatification, to avoid conflicting with the greater ferias of Advent.

In 1950, Pope Pius XII named Frances Xavier Cabrini as the patron saint of immigrants, recognizing her efforts on their behalf across the Americas in schools, orphanages, hospitals, and prisons.

Cabrini is also informally recognized as an effective intercessor for finding a parking space. As one priest explained: "She lived in New York City. She understands traffic."

Shrines

Chicago, Illinois (National Shrine)

After Cabrini's death, her convent room at Columbus Hospital, in Chicago's Lincoln Park neighborhood, became a popular destination for the faithful seeking personal healing and spiritual comfort. Due to the overwhelming number of pilgrims after her canonization in 1946, the Archbishop of Chicago, Cardinal Samuel Stritch, commissioned a large National Shrine in her honor within the hospital complex. He dedicated the shrine in 1955.

The hospital and shrine closed in 2002 to be replaced by a high-rise development on North Lakeview Avenue. Still, the shrine and Cabrini's room were preserved and refurbished during the long demolition and construction period. They were solemnly blessed and re-dedicated by Cardinal Francis George on September 30, 2012, and reopened to the public the next day. The shrine is an architectural gem of gold mosaics, Carrara marble, frescoes, and Florentine stained glass, functioning as a stand-alone center for prayer, worship, spiritual care, and pilgrimage.

Golden, Colorado

In 1904, Cabrini established Denver's Queen of Heaven Orphanage for girls, including many orphans of local Italian miners. In 1910, she purchased a rural property from the town of Golden, on the east slope of Lookout Mountain, as a summer camp for the girls. A small farming operation was established and maintained by three of the Sisters of the Sacred Heart. The camp dormitory, built of native rock and named the Stone House, was completed in 1914 and later listed on the National Register of Historic Places.

Where Cabrini had once located an underground spring on the mountainside, a replica of the Lourdes Grotto was built in 1929, later replaced by a simpler sandstone structure. After Cabrini's canonization, the campsite officially became a shrine. Extensive additions in 1954 included a long Stairway of Prayer for pilgrims following her footpath up the mountain, marked with the Stations of the Cross, leading to a  Statue of Jesus at the highest point of the site.

Queen of Heaven Orphanage closed in 1967, replaced by a system of foster care. The summer campsite became a year-round facility for retreats and small prayer gatherings. A new convent building, completed in 1970, includes housing for the resident Sisters, overnight accommodations for visitors, a chapel dedicated to the Sacred Heart, and an exhibit of artifacts and clothing once used by Cabrini. The statues and stained-glass windows of the chapel came from Villa Cabrini Academy in Burbank, California, a former school founded by the Missionary Sisters.

Upper Manhattan, New York

The St. Frances Xavier Cabrini Shrine in the Hudson Heights neighborhood of Upper Manhattan overlooks the Hudson River, the George Washington Bridge, and the New Jersey Palisades.

As Cabrini's cause for sainthood accelerated in 1933, the Missionary Sisters moved her remains from the Sacred Heart Orphanage she had founded in rural West Park, New York, to the chapel of Sacred Heart Villa, a Catholic school she had founded in Manhattan, freshly renamed Mother Cabrini High School. When it became a popular pilgrimage site with her beatification in 1938, the Sisters enshrined the major portion of her body in a glass-enclosed coffin under the altar of the school chapel. Her 1946 canonization brought a further sustained level of public interest, so in 1957–1960 a larger shrine was built adjoining the school.

When the new shrine was near completion in 1959, her remains were transferred to a large bronze-and-glass reliquary casket in the shrine's altar. She still rests in perpetual display for veneration, covered with her religious habit and a sculpted face mask and hands for more-lifelike viewing.

In addition to accommodating the public, the new shrine also served Cabrini High School students as a place for their liturgies and prayer services until the school closed in 2014. "Today, the shrine continues as a center of welcome for new immigrants and pilgrims of many nationalities who come to pray and reflect."

Other shrines

Southwark, London, England: In St George's Cathedral, Southwark, where Cabrini regularly worshipped during her time in London, a shrine was dedicated to her in 2009, designed by brothers Theodore, James, and Gabriel Gillick. The bronze sculpture depicts the saint watching over a group of migrants standing on a pile of suitcases.

Burbank, California, U.S.: Near the site of Villa Cabrini Academy (1937–1970), Burbank's Cabrini shrine consists of a chapel founded by Cabrini in 1916, relocated to St. Francis Xavier Church and renovated during 1973–1975, and joined by a library wing in 1993. The Italian Catholic Federation sponsors the shrine.

Lewiston, New York, U.S.: Near Niagara Falls, the Basilica of the National Shrine of Our Lady of Fatima includes a shrine to Cabrini along the Avenues of Saints.

Lower Manhattan, New York, U.S.: Our Lady of Pompeii Church was founded in 1892 as a national parish to serve the Italian-American immigrants of Greenwich Village. Cabrini and her Missionary Sisters taught religious education there for a time, and the church now honors her with a shrine, a statue, and a stained-glass window.

Peru, New York, U.S.: In 1947, one year after Cabrini's canonization, a shrine was dedicated to her in Peru, New York, near the state's northern border with Canada. The shrine is a stone grotto located on the grounds of St. Patrick's, a mission church built in 1841 for Irish immigrants.

Scranton, Pennsylvania, U.S.: In 1899–1900, Cabrini helped to found St. Lucy parish and school for Scranton's Italian immigrants. A century later, the church dedicated a shrine in honor of St. Cabrini.

Legacy

Churches and parishes

Italy
St. Frances Cabrini Parish (parrocchia Santa Francesca Cabrini), Codogno
St. Frances Cabrini Parish (parrocchia Santa Francesca Cabrini), Lodi
St. Frances Cabrini Parish (parrocchia Santa Francesca Cabrini), Rome
St. Peter's Basilica, Vatican City,  statue of "S. Francisca Xaveria Cabrini", included among 39 saints who founded religious congregations

United States
St. Frances Cabrini Church in Camp Verde, Arizona
St. Frances Cabrini Catholic Church in Tucson, Arizona
St. Frances Cabrini Parish in San Jose, California
St. Frances Xavier Cabrini Catholic Church in Yucaipa, California
St. Frances Cabrini Catholic Church] in Littleton, Colorado
St. Frances Cabrini Church in North Haven, Connecticut
St. Frances Xavier Cabrini Catholic Church in Parrish, Florida
St. Frances Xavier Cabrini Catholic Parish in Spring Hill, Florida
St. Frances Cabrini Church in Savannah, Georgia
St. Frances Cabrini Parish in Springfield, Illinois
St. Frances Cabrini Church in New Orleans, Louisiana, built in 1953 and destroyed in Hurricane Katrina in 2005
The former St. Frances X. Cabrini Church in Scituate, Massachusetts, officially closed in 2004 but kept open by parishioners until 2016
St. Frances Cabrini Parish in Allen Park, Michigan
St. Frances Cabrini Catholic Church in Minneapolis, Minnesota
St. Frances Cabrini Catholic Church in Paris, Missouri
St. Frances Cabrini Church in Omaha, Nebraska, a historic landmark and former cathedral
St. Frances Cabrini Church in Brooklyn, New York
St. Frances Cabrini Church in Coram, New York
St. Frances Cabrini Church in Roosevelt Island, New York
St. Frances Cabrini Catholic Church in Conneaut, Ohio
St. Frances Xavier Cabrini Parish in Lorain, Ohio
St. Frances Cabrini Catholic Church in Aliquippa, Pennsylvania
Mother Cabrini Parish in Shamokin, Pennsylvania
St. Frances Cabrini Catholic Church in Lebanon, Tennessee
St. Frances Xavier Cabrini Catholic Church in El Paso, Texas
St. Frances Cabrini Parish in Houston, Texas
St. Frances Xavier Cabrini Catholic Church in Benton City, Washington
St. Frances Cabrini Parish in West Bend, Wisconsin

Other countries
St Francesca Cabrini Italian Church in Bedford, England

Educational institutions

Italy
Istituto Comprensivo "F.S. Cabrini" in Milan

United States
The former Villa Cabrini Academy (1937–1970) in Burbank, California
St. Frances X. Cabrini Catholic School in Los Angeles, California
Frances Xavier Cabrini Hall, a student residence at Sacred Heart University in Fairfield, Connecticut
St. Frances Cabrini School in Savannah, Georgia
Cabrini High School in New Orleans, Louisiana
Cabrini High School in Allen Park, Michigan
St. Frances Cabrini Academy elementary school in St. Louis, Missouri
Saint Frances Cabrini Catholic Academy in Brooklyn, New York
The former Mother Cabrini High School (1899–2014) in Manhattan, New York
St. Frances Cabrini Catholic School in Philadelphia, Pennsylvania
Cabrini University in Radnor, Pennsylvania
The former St. Frances Cabrini School (now the Cabrini Apartments) on St. Frances Cabrini Avenue in Scranton, Pennsylvania
Mother Cabrini School in Caparra Heights, Puerto Rico

Other countries
Instituto Cabrini in Buenos Aires, Argentina
Colégio Madre Cabrini, Sao Paulo, Brazil
Ensemble Scolaire Françoise Cabrini in Noisy-le-Grand, France (former orphanage)
LPU-St. Cabrini College of Allied Medicine in Calamba, Laguna, Philippines
Colegio Santa Francisca Javier Cabrini in Madrid, Spain
St Francesca Cabrini Catholic Primary School in London, UK

Hospitals

Cabrini Health, a network of Catholic hospitals in Melbourne, Australia
Santa Cabrini Hospital, founded in 1958 in Montreal, Canada, honoring her popularity among the Italian community
St. Frances Cabrini Medical Center and Cancer Institute in Santo Tomas City, Batangas, Philippines
The former St. Cabrini Hospital (c.1946–c.2002) in Chicago, Illinois, which she founded in 1905 as Columbus Hospital, now the site of her National Shrine
Christus St. Frances Cabrini Hospital in Alexandria, Louisiana, founded shortly after her canonization, and named because Bishop Charles Greco had met her in his childhood
The former Cabrini Medical Center (1973–2008) in Manhattan, New York, whose predecessor Columbus Hospital was co-founded by Cabrini in 1892

Other tributes

St. Cabrini Home, West Park, New York, was Cabrini's early orphanage, headquarters, and burial place.
The Cabrini Museum and Spirituality Center occupies her original convent in Codogno, Italy.
RSA Santa Francesca Cabrini is an assisted living facility in Codogno.
The Cabrini Mission Foundation, founded in 1998, is a non-profit organization that raises funds to support worldwide Cabrini programs and institutions focused on health care, education, and social services.
The Cabrini Sisters operate Cabrini Eldercare, a pair of non-profit residential facilities in Manhattan and Dobbs Ferry, New York.
Cabrini was inducted into the National Women's Hall of Fame in 1996.
Cabrini was inducted into the Colorado Women's Hall of Fame in 2022.
Colorado replaced its Columbus Day state holiday with Cabrini Day starting in 2020.
Milan Central railway station was dedicated to Cabrini in 2010.
Chicago's Cabrini–Green housing project, built 1942–1962, was named in honor of her work with Italian immigrants in the location. It has since been mostly torn down.
Cabrini Boulevard and "Cabrini Woods Nature Sanctuary" are adjacent to the Cabrini shrine in Manhattan, New York.
In a 2019 New York City survey, Cabrini was "the leading vote-getter by far" among more than 300 nominees for the "She Built NYC" municipal statue program. Mayor Bill de Blasio and First Lady Chirlane McCray nevertheless declined a Cabrini statue and were widely criticized, until Governor Andrew Cuomo stepped in to commission one with state funds. On Columbus Day 2020, Cabrini's public memorial was unveiled in Manhattan's Battery Park City, looking out at the immigration landmarks of Ellis Island and the Statue of Liberty.
Mother Cabrini Park in Newark, New Jersey, includes a 1958 statue of the saint on the former site of one of her schools.
Mother Cabrini Park was created in Brooklyn, New York, in 1992, one hundred years after she established a school on the site.
A 2012 mural on the side of Arriana Condominium in Carroll Gardens, Brooklyn, honors Cabrini and the local Italian community.
Pope Francis's religious vocation was partly inspired by Cabrini's ministry to his family's Italian immigrant community in Argentina.

See also
 American Catholic Servants of God, Venerables, Beatified, and Saints
 Italians in Chicago
 List of Catholic saints
 Saint Frances Xavier Cabrini, patron saint archive

Notes

References

Further reading
 Lorit, Sergio C. Frances Cabrini. New City Press (1975, Second Printing).

External links

 
 
 "Cardinal Spellman Honors Mother Cabrini". Newsreel footage marking her canonization (1946).

1850 births
1917 deaths
19th-century Italian Roman Catholic religious sisters and nuns
20th-century American Roman Catholic nuns
20th-century Christian saints
American people of Lombard descent
American Roman Catholic saints
Burials in Ulster County, New York
Canonizations by Pope Pius XII
Christian female saints of the Late Modern era
Deaths from malaria
Founders of Catholic religious communities
Italian emigrants to the United States
Italian Roman Catholic saints
Naturalized citizens of the United States
People from Codogno
People of the Roman Catholic Archdiocese of New York